The 2013–14 season was the 87th season in ACF Fiorentina's history, their 76th season in Serie A, and the ninth consecutive season since promotion from Serie B in 2004. Fiorentina competed in Serie A, in the 2013–14 edition in Coppa Italia, and, having earned qualification by finishing fourth in the 2012–13 Serie A, in the UEFA Europa League.

Season review
The 2012–13 season was a drastic reversal of fortune from the 2011–12 season, in which Fiorentina was involved in a relegation battle. The club narrowly missed out on UEFA Champions League football, vying with Milan up until the last week of the season.

Fiorentina made its first foray into the 2013 summer transfer window merely days after the end of the 2012–13 Serie A by announcing the free transfer of Oleksandr Yakovenko on May 22. On May 31, it was announced that Marcos Alonso will be joining the club following the expiration of his contract at Bolton Wanderers. On June 12, Fiorentina announced that Spanish national Joaquín has agreed to sign on from Spanish club Málaga. Shortly after, the club stated that it will retain Juan Cuadrado after purchasing a 50% co-ownership rights from Udinese. On June 18, Fiorentina announced the signing of Gustavo Munúa, a goalkeeper, who transferred from La Liga club Levante. On June 13, Fiorentina and Torino reached an agreement regarding co-ownerships of Alessio Cerci (who will be fully owned by Torino) and Marko Bakić (will be fully owned by Fiorentina) with undisclosed fee.

Jersey kits for the upcoming season were presented in a ceremony on July 3, 2013 with a gray kit replacing the red and white third kit from last season. On July 4, the club announced the signing of Massimo Ambrosini on a free transfer following the expiration of his contract with Milan. On July 9, 2013, Parma announced the signing of Felipe from Fiorentina. The club sold Haris Seferovic to Real Sociedad on July 11. The next day on July 12, the club announced the transfer of Mario Gómez from Bayern Munich. On July 18, the club announced the sale of Stevan Jovetić to Manchester City. On July 23, the club announced the signing of Josip Iličić from Palermo.

On August 9, Fiorentina was drawn against Grasshopper Club Zürich for qualification into the group stage of the UEFA Europa League. Despite losing the 2nd leg at home 1–0, Fiorentina advanced to the Europa League group stage based on away goals after winning the leg at Zürich 2–1.

Players

Squad information
Last updated on 18 May 2014
Appearances include league matches only

Fiorentina Primavera

Squad number indicates first team number. 

 (c)

Transfers

In

Out

Larrondo, Llama, Migliaccio, Sissoko, and Viviano returned to their parent clubs after their loan periods expired on June 30, 2013. Luca Toni's contract expired on June 30, 2013, and he opted not to renew with the club.

Competitions

Overall

Last updated: 18 May 2014

Serie A

League table

Results summary

Results by round

Matches

Coppa Italia

UEFA Europa League

Play-off round

Group stage

Knockout phase

Round of 32

Round of 16

Statistics

Appearances and goals

|-
! colspan=12 style="background:#9400D3; color:#FFFFFF; text-align:center"| Goalkeepers

|-
! colspan=12 style="background:#9400D3; color:#FFFFFF; text-align:center"| Defenders

|-
! colspan=12 style="background:#9400D3; color:#FFFFFF; text-align:center"| Midfielders

|-
! colspan=12 style="background:#9400D3; color:#FFFFFF; text-align:center"| Forwards

|-
! colspan=12 style="background:#9400D3; color:#FFFFFF; text-align:center"| Players transferred out during the season

Goalscorers

Last updated: 18 May 2014

Clean sheets

Last updated: 18 May 2014

Disciplinary record

Last updated: 18 May 2014

References

ACF Fiorentina seasons
Fiorentina
Fiorentina